Herbert Norman Wilson (26 December 1893 – 17 December 1956) was an Australian rules footballer who played with Essendon in the Victorian Football League (VFL).

A wingman recruited from Hawthorn, Wilson played his one only VFL match for Essendon against Melbourne in Round 9 of the 1913 VFL season after Essendon made wholesale changes to its side that had played two matches on the previous long weekend (a regular Saturday fixture and another on the King's Birthday Monday). He did not play another senior game for the club.

He later fought in France during World War I.

Notes

External links 

1893 births
1956 deaths
Australian rules footballers from Melbourne
Essendon Football Club players
Australian military personnel of World War I
People from Oakleigh, Victoria
Military personnel from Melbourne